Kulikovo Field (or Kulikovo Pole; lit. "snipes' field") is a field near Yepifan, Tula Oblast in Russia where the Battle of Kulikovo took place on September 8, 1380 and was won by prince Dmitri, who became known as Donskoy (of the Don) after the battle.

Today, Kulikovo Field is home to a museum complex to commemorate the battle, which includes a 28-metre high column on the Red Hill (Красный Холм) built between 1848 and 1850, and a memorial church in honour of Sergius of Radonezh (built from 1913 to 1918 according to a design by Alexey Shchusev) that is now the Kulikovo Field Museum.

There is a stone church in the nearby settlement of Monastyrshchino (Монастырщино) where, according to a legend, the fallen Russian soldiers were interred after the battle. No burials have been found so far, which poses a puzzle for scholars who estimate that the battle claimed up to 200,000 lives on both sides.

References

External links
 Official site

Geography of Tula Oblast
Military and war museums in Russia
Museums in Tula Oblast
Cultural heritage monuments of federal significance in Tula Oblast